Sofie Hendrickx (born May 18, 1986) is a Belgian basketball player for BC Namur-Capitale and the Belgian national team.

She participated at the EuroBasket Women 2017.

References

1986 births
Living people
Belgian women's basketball players
People from Lier, Belgium
Power forwards (basketball)
Sportspeople from Antwerp Province